Henrietta Gayer born Henrietta Jones (1700s – 25 March 1814) was a Methodist leader in Lisburn in Ireland.

Life 
Gayer's early life is sketchy but it is known that her father was Valentine Jones of Lisburn. She comes to notice when she married Edward Gayer of Derryaghy in 1772. Her husband was also from the Lisburn area and he was the clerk to the Irish House of Lords. She became single minded in her religious pursuits. She was advised to get more involved with "fashionable amusements" by a member of the clergy and this resulted in her reading from a prayer book in between dances buring a ball at Dublin Castle.

In the 1760s Methodism had gained a following in her area of Ireland. Gayer resisted getting involved as her husband was opposed to the new religion, but she accepted an invitation from Jane Cumberland to come to her house where there was a meeting of Methodists. Gayer took with her daughter who was thirteen and they both decided to join the Methodists. Her husband met John Wesley in 1773 when he preached at Derryaghy and he was impressed by him. The Gayer family set aside a room in their house where visiting preachers could stay. They called this room "the Prophet's Chamber".

Gayer and a preacher named John Johnston had led the way for a Methodist chapel to be opened in Lisburn in 1772 and Gayer attracted converts including her niece Agnes Smyth in 1775. Smythe was to convince her husband Edward, a curate, that he too should be come a Methodist.

John Wesley was gravely ill during his visit to Lisburn in June 1775. He stayed at the Gayer home in Derryaghy. Wesley was so ill that they thought he would die. Prayers were said "for another fifteen years" and he recovered remarkably quickly (and did live for another 15 years).

Agnes Smythe's husband lost his living as a curate in 1776.

Gayer's husband died in 1799.

Death and legacy

She continued to advocate for the Methodist cause and to give whatever she could to worthy causes. As a result, when she died in 1814 she left no bequests having successfully given all of her money away. The later enlarged chapel still stands as the "Christian Workers’ Union Hall" and the congregation operates in Lisburn at a building in Seymour Street. Agnes Smyth went on to be a curate. Gayer's daughter Mary and her husband Richard Wolfenden were hosts to John Wesley when he visited in June 1787. Wesley twisted together two beech samplings in their garden to illustrate the bond he hoped that could be made between the Methodists and the Irish Church. An agreement like this was made in 2002. It was signed under the now two intertwined beech trees in memory of Wesley's hope.

References 

1700s births
1814 deaths
People from Lisburn
Methodist evangelists